The 1945 Cork Senior Football Championship was the 57th staging of the Cork Senior Football Championship since its establishment by the Cork County Board in 1887.

Clonakilty entered the championship as the defending champions.

On 21 October 1945, Fermoy won the championship following a 0–06 to 0–03 defeat of Clonakilty in the final. This was their 7th championship title overall and their first title since 1906.

Results

Semi-finals

Final

Championship statistics

Miscellaneous
 Fermoy win their first title since 1906, having lost the last three finals.
 For the fourth season in a row Fermoy face Clonakilty.

References

Cork Senior Football Championship